Leucanopsis pseudofalacra is a moth of the family Erebidae. It was described by Walter Rothschild in 1917. It is found in Nicaragua.

References

pseudofalacra
Moths described in 1917